Svein Olav Blindheim (born 25 July 1954) is a Norwegian jazz double bassist, composer and writer, and the brother of jazz pianist Oddbjørn Blindheim.

Biography 
Blindheim was born in Ålesund, Norway and raised in Vigra, Sunnmøre, and has played in numerous orchestras and bands and released several recordings, including with Arild Nyquist and Lars Martin Myhre. He also plays in the band Gutta på skauen together with Per Vollestad and Fredrik Øie Jensen. Blindheim has resided in Hønefoss since 1983.

Bibliography 
2008: Tannregulering med Tørkesnor

Discography

Solo albums 
2008: Litt A' Kvart
2009: Junikveld

Collaborations 
1985: Kalde Øl Og Heite Jenter, with Trio Tre, including Arild Nyquist, Lars Martin Myhre
1987: 'Slemme Lars' Og Noen Andre (Tunsberg Grammofon), with Arild Nyquist
1993: Sol & Regn (SOL Records), with Arild Nyquist
1998: Odd Børretzens Mest Ålreite (Bare Bra Musikk), Compilation	on "Vi Drømte Om Amerika"
1999: Horace Hello (Gemini Records), within Oddbjørn Blindheim Trio

References

External links 

1954 births
Living people
Norwegian writers
Musicians from Ålesund
Norwegian jazz upright-bassists
Male double-bassists
Jazz double-bassists
Norwegian composers
Norwegian male composers
Norwegian jazz composers
Spellemannprisen winners
Ponca Jazz Records artists
21st-century double-bassists
Male jazz composers
21st-century Norwegian male musicians
People from Ringerike (municipality)